A stanitsa is a village inside a Cossack host (sometimes translated as "Cossack Army"). Stanitsas — Cossack military settlements — were the primary unit of Cossack hosts.

While the word stanitsa survives in modern usage, the stanitsa as a social system in its historic context was effectively destroyed in the aftermath of the 1917 Russian revolution, when the Russian Civil War (1917–1922) and subsequent  collectivisation (1928–1940) of the land by the state in the  Stalinist period and the Holodomor (1932–1933) destroyed the culture and the economic foundations of stanitsas.

Historical definition 
Historically, the stanitsa was a unit of economic and political organisation of the Cossack peoples — primarily in the southern regions of the Russian Empire. 

Each stanitsa held much of the local land  in common, subject to annual allocation to Cossack families by the Ataman, the appointed leader of the community.  This was a fully  democratic, unique process, characteristic of Russia's South only. (A similar democratic system operated only in the Novgorod Republic, prior to its annexation by the Grand Duchy of Moscow in 1478.)

Modern usage

In modern Russia, the administration classifies a stanitsa as a type of rural locality. Stanitsas mostly predominate in the southern regions of Rostov Oblast,  Krasnodar and Stavropol Krais and most of the Republics of the Northern Caucasus.

See also 
 , or Cossack stanitsa

History of the Cossacks
Rural geography 
Geography of Russia 
Human habitats
Cossack culture
Types of populated places